Zoé is the debut studio album by Mexican alternative rock band Zoé, released in 2001.

Track listing 

Zoé albums
2001 debut albums